The Grand Prix du Disque for French Song is one of a number of prizes awarded by L'Académie Charles Cros as part of the yearly Grand Prix du Disque.  The following is a partial list of winners (sometimes more than one per year):

1948
 Les Compagnons de la chanson for "La Marie"
 Jacqueline François

1949
Henri Salvador

1951
Félix Leclerc for Moi, mes souliers
Francis Lemarque

1954
Georges Brassens for Les amoureux des bancs publiques

1956
 François Deguelt

1959
Serge Gainsbourg for Du chant à la une!

1963
Jean Ferrat for Nuit et brouillard
Françoise Hardy for her debut studio album Tous les garçons et les filles

1964
Nana Mouskouri for Mes plus belles chansons grecques (Grand Prix de Musicologie pour le Folklore)
Sheila
 Claude François
 Jacques Brel for the song "Amsterdam"

1965
Barbara for Barbara chante Barbara
Serge Reggiani

1966
 Jacqueline Dulac for Lorsqu'on est heureux

1967
Nana Mouskouri for Le coeur trop tendre (Grand Prix de la chanson)
Régine (Prix Pierre-Brive Consécration)
Jacques Dutronc (Prix Pierre-Brive Consécration)

1968
Michel Delpech for Il y a des jours où on ferait mieux de rester au lit

1969
Julien Clerc for Julien Clerc (debut album)
Frida Boccara for «Un jour, un enfant» (album)

1970
Brigitte Fontaine for Comme à la radio
Gilles Vigneault for Du milieu du pont
Dani for her debut album

1971
Mogollar for Rythmes de la Turquie d'hier à aujourd'hui

1973
Francis Lemarque for Paris populi

1974
Nicoletta for Enfants venez chanter l'espoir

1976
Jean Michel Jarre for Oxygene
Jacques Higelin for Alertez les bébés
Julos Beaucame for the whole of his work

1977
Yves Duteil for La tarantelle
Ange for Par les fils de Mandrin

1980
Jean Guidoni for Je marche dans les villes

1982
Bernard Haillant for Des mots chair, des mots sang

1984
Léo Ferré for Léo Ferré au Théâtre des Champs-Elysées
Jean Michel Jarre for Zoolook
Jane Birkin for Baby Alone in Babylone

1985
Morice Benin for Chants de solitude

1987
Jean Guidoni for Tigre de porcelaine

1989
Francis Lemarque

1995
Gigi Bourdin and La Rouchta for Les Ours du Scorff

1996
Renée Claude for On a marché sur l'amour
Brigitte Fontaine for Genre humain

1997
Romain Didier for En concert

1998
Rodolphe Burger for Meteor Show
Claude Nougaro for L'enfant phare

2000
Alan Wilder for Liquid

2002
Arno for Arno Charles Ernest (Delabel 7243 81 19592 5)
Zebda for Utopie d'occase (Barclay 065088-2)
Juliette for Le festin de Juliette (Polydor 589 593) (Adami Prize)

2003
Entre deux caisses for Faute de grives...
Mickey 3D for Tu vas pas mourir de rire
Herman van Veen for Chapeau (Francophonie award)

2004
Richard Desjardins for Kanasuta (Francophonie award)
Jeanne Cherhal for 12 fois par an (Singer award)
Tryo for Grain De Sable (Group award)

2005
Clarika for Joker
Agnès Bihl for Merci Maman, merci Papa
Pierre Lapointe (Francophonie award)

2006
 Claire Diterzi for Boucle
 Renan Luce for Repenti (Discovery award)

2007
 Ridan for L’ange de mon démon
 Amélie les Crayons for La porte plume

2008
 Christophe for Aimer ce que nous sommes
 Alex Beaupain for 33 Tours
 Louise Forestier for Ephémères (Francophonie award)

2009
 La Grande Sophie for Des vagues et des ruisseaux
 Benjamin Biolay for La Superbe
 Ariane Moffatt for Tous les sens (Francophonie award)

2010
 Alain Chamfort (in honorem)
 Bertrand Belin for Hypernuit
 Zaz for Zaz

2011
 Louis Chedid (in honorem)
 Daphné for Bleu Venise
 L for Initiale

References

French Song